Spain competed at the 1960 Summer Olympics in Rome, Italy. 144 competitors, 133 men and 11 women, took part in 83 events in 16 sports.

Medalists

Bronze
Pedro Amat, Francisco Caballer, Juan Calzado, José Colomer, Carlos del Coso, José Dinarés, Eduardo Dualde, Joaquin Dualde, Rafael Egusquiza, Ignacio Macaya, Pedro Murúa, Pedro Roig, Luis Usoz, and Narciso Ventalló — Field Hockey, Men's Team Competition

Athletics

Basketball

Men's Team Competition
Preliminary Round (Group D)
 Defeated Uruguay (77-72) 
 Lost to Philippines (82-84)
 Defeated Poland (75-63)
First Classification Round (9-16th place)
 Lost to Mexico (66-80)
 Lost to France (40-78)
 Defeated Japan (66-64)
Second Classification Round (13-16th place)
 Lost to Puerto Rico (65-75)
 Defeated Bulgaria (2-0 walk-over) → 14th place
Team Roster
Agustín Bertomeu
Alfonso Martínez
Emiliano Rodríguez
Francisco Buscató
Jesús Codina
Joaquín Enseñat
Jorge Guillén
Josep Lluís Cortés
José Nora
Juan Martos
Miguel Ángel González
Santiago Navarro

Boxing

Canoeing

Cycling

Nine male cyclists represented Spain in 1960.

Individual road race
 José Antonio Momeñe
 Ignacio Astigarraga
 Juan Sánchez
 Ventura Díaz

Team time trial
 Ignacio Astigarraga
 Juan Sánchez
 José Antonio Momeñe
 Ramón Sáez Marzo

Sprint
 José María Errandonea
 Francisco Tortellá

Team pursuit
 José María Errandonea
 Francisco Tortellá
 Miguel Martorell
 Miguel Mora Gornals

Equestrian

Fencing

11 fencers, 8 men and 3 women, represented Spain in 1960.

Men's foil
 Joaquín Moya
 Enrique González
 Jesús Díez

Men's épée
 Manuel Martínez
 Jesús Díez
 Pedro Cabrera

Men's team épée
 Pedro Cabrera, Manuel Martínez, Jesús Díez, Joaquín Moya

Men's sabre
 Ramón Martínez
 Pablo Ordejón
 César de Diego

Men's team sabre
 Jesús Díez, César de Diego, Pablo Ordejón, Ramón Martínez

Women's foil
 María Shaw
 Carmen Valls
 Pilar Tosat

Gymnastics

Hockey

Modern pentathlon

Two male pentathletes represented Spain in 1960.

Individual
 Joaquín Villalba
 Fernando Irayzoz

Rowing

Spain had 18 male rowers participate in four out of seven rowing events in 1960.

 Men's single sculls
 Julio López

 Men's coxed pair
 Enrique Castelló
 José Sahuquillo
 Joaquín del Real (cox)

 Men's coxed four
 Franco Cobas
 Emilio García
 José Méndez
 Alberto Valtierra
 Armando González

 Men's eight
 Ignacio Alcorta
 José Almandoz
 José Aristegui
 Santiago Beitia
 José Ibarburu
 Manuel Ibarburu
 José Leiceaga
 Trimido Vaqueriza
 Faustino Amiano

Sailing

Shooting

Eight shooters represented Spain in 1960.
Men

Swimming

Weightlifting

Wrestling

References

External links
Spanish Olympic Committee
Official Olympic Reports
International Olympic Committee results database

Nations at the 1960 Summer Olympics
1960
Oly